Corkscrew claw syndrome is the combination of corkscrew deformities in heifers of the medial claws of both the rear and front feet that causes permanent damage to the pedal bone.

References

Further reading
 
 
 
 
 

Cattle
Bovine podiatry